Uragano has been borne by at least two ships of the Italian Navy:

 , previously the mercantile Dimon purchased by Italy in 1916 and renamed. She was discarded in 1919.
 , a  launched in 1942 and sunk in 1943 by a naval mine.

References

Italian Navy ship names